This article is a list of British Academy Award winners and nominees. This list details the filmmakers, actors, actresses, and others born and working in the United Kingdom who have been nominated for or have won an Academy Award.

Best Actor in a Leading Role

Best Actress in a Leading Role

Best Actor in a Supporting Role

Best Actress in a Supporting Role

Best Director

Best Assistant Director (1933 to 1937)

Best Writing – Adapted Screenplay

Best Writing – Original Screenplay

Best Writing – Story (1928 to 1956)

Best Picture

Best International Feature Film

Best Documentary Feature

Best Documentary – Short Subject

Best Animated Feature

Best Animated Short Film

Best Production Design

Best Cinematography

Best Editing

Best Sound

Best Sound Editing (1963 to 2019)

Best Costume Design

Best Makeup and Hairstyling

Best Original Score

Best Original Song

Best Visual Effects

Best Live Action Short Film

Special Awards

Nominations and Winners

See also
Cinema of the United Kingdom
List of British actors
List of British films
British Academy Film Awards
List of Irish Academy Award winners and nominees

References

British
Lists of British award winners